The Ministry of Economic Affairs and Digital Transformation (MINECO) is the department of the Government of Spain responsible for the proposing and carrying out the government policy on economic affairs, business support and reforms to improve economic potential growth as well as acting as the communication channel with the European Union and other economic and financial international organizations in this matters. Likewise, this department is responsible for the telecommunications policy and the digital transformation.

This has been a ministry that for most of its history has been linked to the Ministry of the Treasury, including a large part of the democratic stage, although they are now separated.

The MINECO is headed by the Economy Minister, a Cabinet member who is appointed by the Monarch at request of the Prime Minister, after hearing the Council of Ministers. The Minister of Economy and Business is assisted by five high-ranking officials, the Secretary of State for Economy and Business Support, the Secretary of State for Telecommunications and Digital Infraestructures, the Secretary of State for Digitization and Artificial Intelligence the Secretary General for the Treasury and International Financing and the Under Secretary of Economic Affairs. The current minister is Deputy PM Nadia Calviño, a former EU Civil Servant in charge of the EU Budget.

History

Origin and protectionism 
The responsibilities over the economy had been integrated in the Ministry of the Treasury since its creation in the 18th century. However, because of the weakness and the deficiencies of the Spanish industry and trade sectors, during the dictatorship of Miguel Primo de Rivera was needed an autarchic policy. In addition, after the World War I the complexity of international markets had plunged Spain into a strong industrial crisis.

As a result, the sectors affected demanded a protectionist tariff policy in defense of national production against foreign one and, in turn, make it easy the exports. Thus began an autarchic policy based on economic nationalism and tariff protectionism whose best example is the Cambó tariff of 1922. This policy was assumed by the dictatorship of Primo de Rivera. Thus a certain economic bonanza was achieved that was truncated by the Great Depression of 1929.

The Cambo tariff was the technical and fiscal response to the critical deficit situation of the Spanish trade balance since 1920. It was a tariff policy that served two competing needs: one was to protect the different sectors of the Spanish economy against the international, heavily taxing imports of products produced by foreign counterparts; another responded to the need to defend export agriculture, a sector with a large foreign market and which was damaged by the rise in tariffs, victim of the consequent increases in the countries affected by the Spanish measures.

This was solved with the signing of international treaties of Commerce and Navigation agreeing a particular and significant reduction of the tariff with each one of the foreign nations with which commercial exchanges took place. Flores de Lemus defined the situation that was lucidly created: there was a complementarity between export agriculture and agriculture and industry in need of protection, although the instruments used by the Government were opposed and a continuous tension was created between them.

Dictatorship, Republic and Civil War 
Although remote antecedents of the Economy portfolio can be found in the creation of the Ministry of Supply as an immediate consequence of the crisis of 1917; The first step towards the creation of a specific department occurred during the dictatorship of Primo de Rivera when the National Economy Council established by Royal Decree of 8 March 1924.

The council was born with the purpose of studying the problems of the national production and consumption, for the purpose of setting the customs tariffs and determining the way to establish international commercial relations adapted to the Spanish economic reality. For this reason, its main functions were to collect statistics on foreign trade and cabotage; obtain economic and commercial information in Spain and abroad; establish the official valuation of the goods, taking into account the cost of the same; propose new customs tariffs, as well as the revision of nomenclatures and tariffs. It was also responsible for proposing the conclusion of Trade Agreements. Finally, this body served to control all pressure groups in the country and thus channel their antagonistic interests: Boards and chambers of Commerce, Industry and Navigation, associations of producers, employers' organizations and trade unions of all kinds.

The end of the Military Directorate in 1925, the restoration of the ministerial regime and the economic circumstances led to the creation of the Ministry of National Economy (despite its name, it is today the Ministry of Industry) by Royal Decree-Law of 3 November 1928, in response to public opinion that this affairs required to be placed under one direction only, both in terms of production, trade and consumption; and that to date they were dispersed among the rest of the government departments. The National Economy Council depended on the new Economy Ministry, although slightly modified, continuing with its work of collecting and contrasting the realities of the country around each and every one of the sectors of his economic life. By Decree of 16 December 1931, the department was renamed as Ministry of Agriculture, Industry and Trade.

In the middle of the Civil War, the government of the Republic created a Ministry of Finance and Economy, first based in Barcelona and then in Valencia. The head of the new institution was Juan Negrín, who at the same time was Prime Minister. Its creation was ordered by Decree of 17 May 1937 and its functions and structure were dictated by Decree 27 of that same month.

From the economic autarky to the developmentalism of the 1960s 
The catastrophic situation in which the country was plunged after the Civil War and the collapse of international markets caused by the World War II, led to the creation of a new National Economy Council. The new body monitored that all ministries follow the economic guidelines of the Government in a harmonious and coordinated manner. His legal regime constituted him as an autonomous body of work, consultant, adviser and technician in all the matters that affected the national economy. It depended directly on the Office of the Prime Minister.

The importance of the council will be increased, so much that institutionally its president will be compared to those of the Cortes, the Supreme Court, the Court of Auditors and the Council of State. Its power and influence in economic matters, always oriented towards autarky, will be equal to that of the General Secretariat of the Movement. Finally, the president of the council had the rank of Minister without portfolio. Its connection to the most immobile sector of the regime in terms of economy will mean the beginning of its decline. Confronted openly with the Ministries of the Treasury and Commerce for the turn that the Stabilization Plan had made towards a capitalist economy, the National Economy Council gradually began to lose importance in the 1960s. It disappeared in 1977, absorbed by the Ministry of Economy.

During the premiership of Arias Navarro, a specific Deputy Prime Minister was created for economic affairs, a position that was assumed by the head of the Treasury portfolio. The new position implied the disappearance of the Ministry of Development Planning, leaving its Undersecretariat ascribed to the Delegate Commission of the Government for Economic Affairs.

Democracy: the Ministry 
Despite all that, the department that we know today was  created in 1977, named Ministry of Economy. Its creation took place in conjunctural circumstances and of great importance for the economic history of Spain. Once the political transition to democracy began, the second government presided over by Suarez was aware that the constitutional process would be seriously hampered if there was no economic growth. The circumstances were totally contrary due to the serious situation that the country was going through due to the oil crisis of 1973, the ineffectiveness of the measures adopted by the last governments of the dictatorship; as well as the accentuation of the latent problems: inflation, unemployment, external deficit, deficit of the public sector and the low level of investments.

The institutional solutions involved remodeling the General State Administration, creating a Second Deputy Prime Minister for economic affairs and the position of Minister of Economy through several royal decrees signed on 4 July 1977, appointments that fall in Fuentes Quintana. The Ministry, created to group in a single department the different competences in the matter of organization and economic planning and to be able to single out the decisions on economic policy extracting them in part from the Ministry of the Treasury. Its main task was to establish the guidelines of the general economic policy, the short and medium term programming and the study of the proposal of advisable measures to ensure the smooth running of the economy of the country.

To carry out is new duties, the department was structured through a Secretariat of State, an Undersecretariat, a General Technical Secretariat and four directorates-general, one for design the economic policy of the government, other to study and analyse the economic policy and its effects, other one to study the economiy and forecast and a fourth one for finance policy and supervision of banking entities. Most of those bodies were newly created and others were transferred from the Ministry of Finance and the Ministry of the Presidency. The new ministry also assumed the statistical powers of the government through the National Statistics Institute.

The administrative reforms carried out by the first government headed by Felipe González led in 1982 to the merger in one of the departments of Treasury and Economy and Commerce, giving birth to the Ministry of Economy and Finance. This body has continued to operate continuously with the exception of the 7th Cortes Generales (2000-2004), under the premiership of José María Aznar, in which the Treasury and Economy portfolios were split in two. The same happens since the 10th Cortes Generales (2011–present). Between 2016 and 2018, the Ministry of Economy merged with the Ministry of Industry.

Structure 
The Ministry of Economy and Business is organised in the following superior bodies:

 The Secretariat of State for Economy and Business Support
 The General Secretariat for the Treasury and International Financing
 The Directorate-General for the Treasury and Financial Policy.
 The Directorate-General for Economic Policy
 The Directorate-General for Macroeconomic Analysis
 The Directorate-General for Insurance and Pension Funds
 The Secretariat of State for Digitalization and Artificial Intelligence
The General Secretariat for Digital Administration
The Directorate-General for Digitalization and Artificial Intelligence
The Secretariat of State for Telecommunications and Digital Infrastructures
 The General Secretariat for Telecommunications and Organization of Audiovisual Communication Services
 The Undersecretariat of Economic Affairs and Digital Transformation
 The Technical General Secretariat
The Inspectorate of Services
The Deputy Directorate-General for Human Resources
The Deputy Directorate-General for Financial Administration and Administrative Office
The Budget Office
The Deputy Directorate-General for Information and Communication Technologies
The Special Commissioner for the Alliance for the New Economy of Language, with rank of Under-Secretary
The Office of the Special Commissioner for the Alliance for the New Economy of Language

Ministry agencies 

Macroprudential Authority Financial Stability Council.
National Statistics Institute
Official Credit Institute
National Commission on Markets and Competition
National Securities Market Commission
Institute for Accounting and Accounts Audit
SEPBLAC

List of officeholders
Office name:
Ministry of Economy (1977–1980; 2000–2004)
Ministry of Economy and Trade (1980–1982)
Ministry of Economy and Competitiveness (2011–2016)
Ministry of Economy, Industry and Competitiveness (2016–2018)
Ministry of Economy and Business (2018–2020)
Ministry of Economic Affairs and Digital Transformation (2020–present)

Notes

References 

 
Economy And Finance
Economy and Finance
Spain
Government ministries of Spain
Digital policy ministries

fr:Ministère de l'Économie et des Finances (Espagne)